Asterocidaris is a genus of  fossils sea urchins in the family Hemicidaridae. These epifaunal grazer-deposit feeders lived in the Middle and Upper Jurassic age (from 171.6 to 161.2 Ma).

Species
 Asterocidaris besairiei  Lambert, 1936 †
 Asterocidaris meandrina  (Agassiz 1840)  † 
 Asterocidaris ragoti  Lambert, 1936 †

Description
They are hemispherical, flattened beneath, with small apical disc.

Distribution
Fossils of species within this genus have been found in the Middle to Upper Jurassic sediments (Bajocian-Oxfordian) in Europe, Madagascar and Africa (Morocco).

References

Prehistoric echinoid genera
Jurassic echinoderms
Prehistoric echinoderms of Europe
Fossil taxa described in 1852
Prehistoric echinoderms of Africa